Abbasabad (also Romanized as ‘Abbāsābād) is a village in Sefidar Rural District, Khafr District, Jahrom County, Fars Province, Iran. At the 2006 census, its population was 43, in 12 families.

References 

Populated places in  Jahrom County